Anne-Sophie Frigout (born 11 April 1991) is a French educator and politician affiliated to the National Rally. She was elected as a deputy for Marne's 2nd constituency during the 2022 French legislative election. She was previously vice-president of the Debout la France party.

Biography 
Frigout trained as a teacher and taught at a secondary school before working as a professor of geography and history at a further education college in Fismes.

Frigout started in politics as a member of Debout la France and served as vice-president of the party. She was head of the list for Marne in the regional elections of 2015, alongside Laurent Jacobelli but was not elected. In 2021, she stood on the same list for the National Rally and was successful. 

She stood for DLF in Marne's 1st constituency at the 2017 French legislative election, but was eliminated in the first round, coming in seventh place. At the 2022 elections for the French National Assembly she was selected to stand in Marne's 2nd constituency and was elected to represent the seat.

On 2 December 2022, her election was annulled by the Constitutional Council. She lost the seat in the second round of the by-election on 29 January 2023.

References

1991 births
Living people
21st-century French politicians
21st-century French women politicians
Debout la France politicians
National Rally (France) politicians
Deputies of the 16th National Assembly of the French Fifth Republic
French educators
Women members of the National Assembly (France)
Candidates for the 2017 French legislative election